Rhodocactus sacharosa, synonym Pereskia sacharosa, is a species of flowering plant in the cactus family Cactaceae, native from Bolivia and west-central Brazil to Paraguay and northern Argentina. Like all species in the genus Rhodocactus and unlike most cacti, it has persistent leaves. It was first described in 1879.

Description
Mature stems develop bark and, like most other species of Rhodocactus, have stomata. Like all species of Rhodocactus and unlike most other cacti, R. sacharosa has persistent leaves.

Taxonomy
The species was first described by August Grisebach in 1879 as Pereskia sacharosa. The specific epithet sacharosa is a noun in apposition, derived from a vernacular name. One explanation is that it is derived from the Quecha word sacha, meaning 'tree' or 'woods', hence 'tree rose' or 'woods rose'. In 1966, Curt Backeberg transferred the species to the genus Rhodocactus. However, this was not accepted by most botanists, and Rhodocactus was sunk into a broadly circumscribed Pereskia. Molecular phylogenetic studies from 2005 onwards suggested that with this circumscription, Pereskia was not monophyletic, and consisted of three clades. In 2016, the genus Rhodocactus was revived for one of these clades, which included R. sacharosa.

Distribution and habitat
Rhodocactus sacharosa is native to Bolivia and west-central Brazil southwards to Paraguay and northern Argentina.

References

Pereskioideae
Flora of Northeast Argentina
Flora of Northwest Argentina
Flora of Bolivia
Flora of West-Central Brazil
Flora of Paraguay
Plants described in 1879